This is a list of islands of Iran.

Coastal islands

Persian Gulf
Inhabited

 Bent
 Buneh
 Dara
 Farsi
 Faror
 Farvargan
 Hendorabi
 Hengam 
 Hormuz 
 Jonobi
 Kharg
 Kish
 Larak
 Lavan
 Minu
 Qabre Nakhoda
 Qeshm 
 Shidvar Island
 Shif
 Shomali
 Sirri
 Abu Musa
 Greater Tunb
 Lesser Tunb

Uninhabited

 Farvargan (Lesser Farvar) 
 Shidvar 
 Abbasak
 Sheif
 Tahmadu (Jabrin)
 Ommol-korm
 Nakhiloo
 Naaz islands
 Om-e-Sile (Khan)
 Germ
 Bouneh
 Dara
 Ghabr-e-Nakhoda (Captain Grave)
 Kharv
 Mouliat
 Se Dandun (Three Dents)
 Motaf
 Morghi
 Cheraghi

Oman Sea 
 Devil's Island (Iran)

Caspian Sea
Ashuradeh Island

Inland islands
Aras River
427 islands shared with Turkey and Azerbaijan, including:
 Khorameh
 Buiduz
 Pirwaltra
 Gharebagh
 Kasiri

Arvand Rud
 Abadan Island
 Minoo Island

Bakhtegan Lake
 Menak Island

Tashk Lake
Tashk Lake is located at 
 Gonban Island
 Narges Island

Salt Lake (Dasht-e-Kavir)
 Sargardan Island

Lake Urmia
Lake Urmia has 102 islands:

 Aram Island
 Arash Island
 Ardeshir Island
 Arezo Island
 Ashk Island
 Ashk-sar Island
 Ashku Island
 Atash Island
 Azar Island
 Azin Island
 Bahram Island
 Bard Island
 Bardak Island
 Bardin Island
 Barzin Island
 Bastu Island
 Bon Island
 Bon-ashk Island
 Borz Island
 Borzu Island
 Bozorg-tappeh
 Chak-tappeh Island
 Cheshmeh-kenar Island
 Dey Island
 Gorz Island
 Magh Island
 Espir Island
 Espirak Island
 Espiru Island
 Garivak Island
 Gariveh Island
 Gerdeh Island
 Giv Island
 Golgun Island
 Iran-nezhad Island
 Jo-darreh Island
 Jovin Island
 Jozar Island
 Kabudan Island
 Kafcheh-nok Island
 Kaka'i-ye Bala Island
 Kaka'i-ye Miyaneh Island
 Kaka'i-ye Pa'in Island
 Kalsnag Island
 Kam Island
 Kaman Island
 Kameh Island
 Karkas Island
 Kaveh Island
 Kenarak Island
 Khersak Island
 Kuchak-tappeh Island
 Mahdis Island
 Mahvar Island
 Markid Island
 Mehr Island
 Mehrdad Island
 Mehran Island
 Meshkin Island
 Meydan Island
 Miyaneh Island
 Nadid Island
 Nahan Island
 Nahid Island
 Nahoft Island
 Nakhoda Island
 Navi Island
 Naviyan Island
 Omid Island
 Panah Island
 Penhan Island
 Pishva Island
 Sahran Island
 Samani Island
 Sangan Island
 Sangu Island
 Saricheh Island
 Sepid Island
 Shabdiz Island
 Shahi Island
 Shahin Island
 Shamshiran Island
 Shur-tappeh Island
 Shush-tappeh Island
 Siyahsang Island
 Siyah-tappeh Island
 Siyavash Island
 Sohran Island
 Sorkh Island
 Sorush Island
 Tak Island
 Takht Island
 Takhtan Island
 Tanjak Island
 Tanjeh Island
 Tashbal Island
 Tir Island
 Tus Island
 Zagh Island
 Zarkaman Island
 Zarkanak Island
 Zar-tappeh Island
 Zirabeh Island

References

Iran
 
Islands
Tourist attractions in Iran